In mathematics, Siegel modular forms are a major type of automorphic form. These generalize conventional elliptic modular forms which are closely related to elliptic curves. The complex manifolds constructed in the theory of Siegel modular forms are Siegel modular varieties, which are basic models for what a moduli space for abelian varieties (with some extra level structure) should be and are constructed as quotients of the Siegel upper half-space rather than the upper half-plane by discrete groups. 

Siegel modular forms are holomorphic functions on the set of symmetric n × n matrices with positive definite imaginary part; the forms must satisfy an automorphy condition. Siegel modular forms can be thought of as multivariable modular forms, i.e. as special functions of several complex variables.

These primarily arise in various branches of number theory, such as arithmetic geometry and elliptic cohomology. Siegel modular forms have also been used in some areas of physics, such as conformal field theory and black hole thermodynamics in string theory.

Definition

Preliminaries
Let  and define

 

the Siegel upper half-space.

where  is the  identity matrix. Finally, let 

 

be a rational representation, where  is a finite-dimensional complex vector space.

Siegel modular form
Given 

 

and 

 

define the notation 

Then a holomorphic function

 

is a Siegel modular form of degree  (sometimes called the genus), weight , and level  if 

for all .
In the case that , we further require that  be holomorphic 'at infinity'. This assumption is not necessary for  due to the Koecher principle, explained below. Denote the space of weight , degree , and level  Siegel modular forms by

Examples

Some methods for constructing Siegel modular forms include:
Eisenstein series
Theta functions of lattices (possibly with a pluri-harmonic polynomial)
Saito–Kurokawa lift for degree 2
Ikeda lift
Miyawaki lift
Products of Siegel modular forms.

Level 1, small degree
For degree 1, the level 1 Siegel modular forms are the same as level 1 modular forms. The ring of such forms is a polynomial ring C[E4,E6] in the (degree 1) Eisenstein series E4 and E6.

For degree 2,  showed that the ring of level 1 Siegel modular forms is generated by the (degree 2) Eisenstein series E4 and E6 and 3 more forms of weights 10, 12, and 35. The ideal of relations between them is generated by the square of the weight 35 form minus a certain polynomial in the others.

For degree 3,  described the ring of level 1 Siegel modular forms, giving a set of 34 generators.
 
For degree 4, the level 1 Siegel modular forms of small weights have been found. There are no cusp forms of weights 2, 4, or 6. The space of cusp forms of weight 8 is 1-dimensional, spanned by the Schottky form. The space of cusp forms of weight 10 has dimension 1, the space of cusp forms of weight 12 has dimension 2, the space of cusp forms of weight 14 has dimension 3, and the space of cusp forms of weight 16 has dimension 7 .

For degree 5, the space of cusp forms has dimension 0 for weight 10, dimension 2 for weight 12. The space of forms of weight 12 has dimension 5.

For degree 6, there are no cusp forms of weights 0, 2, 4, 6, 8. The space of Siegel modular forms of weight 2 has dimension 0, and those of weights 4 or 6 both have dimension 1.

Level 1, small weight

For small weights and level 1,  give the following results (for any positive degree):
Weight 0: The space of forms is 1-dimensional, spanned by 1. 
Weight 1: The only Siegel modular form is 0.
Weight 2: The only Siegel modular form is 0.
Weight 3: The only Siegel modular form is 0.
Weight 4: For any degree, the space of forms of weight 4 is 1-dimensional, spanned by the theta function of the E8 lattice (of appropriate degree). The only cusp form is 0.
Weight 5: The only Siegel modular form is 0.
Weight 6: The space of forms of weight 6 has dimension 1 if the degree is at most 8, and dimension 0 if the degree is at least 9. The only cusp form is 0.
Weight 7: The space of cusp forms vanishes if the degree is 4 or 7. 
Weight 8:In genus 4, the space of cusp forms is 1-dimensional, spanned by the Schottky form and the space of forms is 2-dimensional. There are no cusp forms if the genus is 8. 
There are no cusp forms if the genus is greater than twice the weight.

Table of dimensions of spaces of level 1 Siegel modular forms

Koecher principle

 

where . Corollary to this theorem is the fact that Siegel modular forms of degree  have Fourier expansions and are thus holomorphic at infinity.

Applications to physics
In the D1D5P system of supersymmetric black holes in string theory, the function that naturally captures the microstates of black hole entropy is a Siegel modular form. In general, Siegel modular forms have been described as having the potential to describe black holes or other gravitational systems.

Siegel modular forms also have uses as generating functions for families of CFT2 with increasing central charge in conformal field theory, particularly the hypothetical AdS/CFT correspondence.

References

 

 

Modular forms
Automorphic forms